The 2012 Patriot League men's basketball tournament was held at campus sites for the higher seeds. The quarterfinals were on February 29, the semi-finals on March 3, and the championship was held on March 7. The winner of the tournament, the Lehigh Mountain Hawks received an automatic bid to the NCAA tournament.

Bracket

References

External links
 2012 Patriot League Men's Basketball Championship

Patriot League men's basketball tournament
Tournament
Patriot League men's basketball tournament
Patriot League men's basketball tournament